Joița is a commune located in Giurgiu County, Muntenia, Romania. It is composed of two villages, Bâcu and Joița.

References

Communes in Giurgiu County
Localities in Muntenia